Victor Emmanuel may refer to:
 Victor Emmanuel I of Sardinia (1759–1824), Duke of Savoy and King of Sardinia
 Victor Emmanuel II of Italy (1820–1878), King of Sardinia and later King of Italy
 Victor Emmanuel III of Italy (1869–1947), King of Italy

See also
Vittorio Emanuele, Prince of Naples (born 1937)
Víctor Manuel (born 1947), Spanish singer
Altare della Patria or National Monument to Victor Emmanuel II, a building in Rome, Italy
Vittorio Emanuele (Rome Metro), a train station in Rome